Królowa dram is the debut studio album by Polish singer Sanah. The album was released on 8 May 2020 through Magic Records. It peaked at number one on the Polish albums chart and has been certified diamond. In addition to new tracks, the album also includes six songs previously included on her debut extended play Ja na imię niewidzialna mam (2019). The album was produced by Paweł Odoszewski, Thomas Martin Leithead-Docherty (Tom Martin), Dominic Buczkowski-Wojtaszek, Kuba Galiński, Bogdan Kondracki, Marcel Závodi, Christian Eberhard, Andrei Idu, Czarny HIFI, Michał Pietrzak, KNOXA and The Maneken.

The album was preceded by three singles: the lead single "Szampan" topped the Polish singles chart for four nonconsecutive weeks, becoming Sanah's first number-one single on the chart, while the second single "Melodia" also peaked at number one. The title track was released as the third single from the album.

Singles
"Szampan" was released as the album's lead single on 3 January 2020. The song became a commercial success in Poland, becoming Sanah's first number-one hit in the country, in addition to being certified diamond, while its music video has also amassed more than 70 million views on YouTube.

"Melodia" was released as the album's second single on 28 February 2020. The song also peaked at number-one in Poland, becoming Sanah's second chart-topping hit in the country. "Królowa dram" was released as the album's third single on 1 May 2020.

Track listing

Charts

Weekly charts

Year-end charts

Certifications

Release history

See also
 List of number-one albums of 2020 (Poland)

References

2020 debut albums
Polish-language albums
Sanah (singer) albums
Magic Records albums